Paraguay competed at the 1996 Summer Olympics in Atlanta, United States. Seven competitors, six men and one woman, took part in seven events in five sports.

Athletics

Key
Note–Ranks given for track events are within the athlete's heat only
Q = Qualified for the next round
q = Qualified for the next round as a fastest loser or, in field events, by position without achieving the qualifying target
NR = National record
N/A = Round not applicable for the event
Bye = Athlete not required to compete in round

Men
Field

Fencing

One male fencer represented Paraguay in 1996.

Judo

Sailing

Open

Swimming

See also
Paraguay at the 1995 Pan American Games

References

External links
Official Olympic Reports

Nations at the 1996 Summer Olympics
1996
Olympics